Chorographia (ko-ro-graph'-i-a)is a rhetorical term used to signify the description of a country. The description can address geographical, sociopolitical, or cultural aspects of a particular land. The scholarly site for rhetorical terms and usage, Silva Rhetoricae, defines chorographia as "...[t]he description of a particular nation".

Chorographia is a type of enargia, which is a rhetorical term for vivid, visual description. Enargia is used in many forms and has several sub-categories such as: Topographia, Geographia, Hydrographia, etc.

Rhetorical use 

It is possible to conclude that chorographia not only describes a land, but works as a rhetorical tool during the invention canon of rhetoric. Chorographia is visual as well as textual. A depiction of a national or geographical landmark is an example of chorographia, whether the depiction is photographic or textual in nature.

Examples 

The following examples of chorographia are excerpts from Álvar Núñez Cabeza de Vaca's book, Castaways:

"The land is level for the most part, from the place where we disembarked to this town and land of Apalachee; the ground is sand and also loam, everywhere there are large trees and clearings in which there are walnut trees and bay trees and others of the kind called gum trees..."(Cabeza de Vaca 12).

"[The people of the nation] wore their hair loose and very long and were covered in cloaks made of sable skins..." (Cabeza de Vaca 35).

References

Rhetorical techniques